Euploea boisduvali , is a butterfly in the family Nymphalidae. It was described by Hippolyte Lucas in 1852. It is found in the Australasian realm

Subspecies
 E. b. boisduvali  (Fiji)
 E. b. brenchleyi  Butler, 1870 (Bougainville, San Cristobal, Santa Ana, Ugi, Rennel)
 E. b. torvina Butler, [1876] (Tana, Aneityum)
 E. b. fraudulenta Butler, 1882 (Woodlark, Solomons)
 E. b. pyrgion  Godman & Salvin, 1888 (Malaita, Guadalcanal, Florida Island)
 E. b. albomarginata  Carpenter, 1942 (San Cristobal, Santa Ana)
 E. b. rileyi  Poulton, 1924 (New Caledonia, Loyalty Islands)
 E. b. bakeri  Poulton, 1926 (New Hebrides, Banks Island)
 E. b. addenda  Howarth, 1962 (Solomons: Bellona Island)

Etymology
The name honours Jean Baptiste Boisduval.

References

External links

Euploea
Butterflies described in 1852